Geert Kuiper (born 5 July 1960) is a Dutch speed skater. He competed in the men's 500 metres event at the 1984 Winter Olympics.

References

1960 births
Living people
Dutch male speed skaters
Olympic speed skaters of the Netherlands
Speed skaters at the 1984 Winter Olympics
Sportspeople from Friesland
Dutch speed skating coaches
Dutch sports coaches
21st-century Dutch people
20th-century Dutch people